Hemiaclis is a genus of sea snails, marine gastropod mollusks in the family Eulimidae.

Species
Species within this genus include the following:
 Hemiaclis carolinensis (Bartsch, 1911)
 Hemiaclis georgiana (Dall, 1927)
 Hemiaclis incolorata (Thiele, 1912)
 Hemiaclis katrinae (Engl, 2006)
 Hemiaclis major (Bouchet & Warén, 1986)
 Hemiaclis obtusa (Bouchet & Warén, 1986)
 Hemiaclis ventrosa (Friele, 1874)

Species brought into synonymy
 Hemiaclis aqabaensis (Bandel, 2005): synonym of Murchisonella aqabaensis (Bandel, 2005)
 Hemiaclis dalli (Bartsch, 1911) : synonym of Aclis sarissa (Watson, 1881)
 Hemiaclis fernandinae (Dall, 1927): synonym of Aclis tenuis A. E. Verrill, 1882
 Hemiaclis glabra (G.O. Sars, 1878) : synonym of Hemiaclis ventrosa (Friele, 1874)
 Hemiaclis lata (Dall, 1927): synonym of Umbilibalcis lata (Dall, 1889)
 Hemiaclis marguerita (Bartsch, 1947) : synonym of Aclis marguerita (Bartsch, 1947)
 Hemiaclis obtusus (Bouchet & Warén, 1986) : synonym of Hemiaclis obtusus (Bouchet & Warén, 1986)
 Hemiaclis tanneri (Bartsch, 1947) : synonym of Aclis tanneri (Bartsch, 1947)
 Hemiaclis ventrosus (Friele, 1876) : synonym of Hemiaclis ventrosa (Friele, 1874)

References

External links
 To World Register of Marine Species
 Gofas, S.; Le Renard, J.; Bouchet, P. (2001). Mollusca. in: Costello, M.J. et al. (eds), European Register of Marine Species: a check-list of the marine species in Europe and a bibliography of guides to their identification. Patrimoines Naturels. 50: 180-213

Eulimidae